A Man Comes Home is a 2007 Danish comedy film directed by Thomas Vinterberg.

Cast 
 Oliver Møller-Knauer - Sebastian 
 Ronja Mannov Olesen - Maria
 Helene Reingaard Neumann - Claudia
 Thomas Bo Larsen - Hans Kristian Schmidt
 Gitte Christensen - Sarah Schmidt 
 Morten Grunwald - Direktøren
  - Sebastians mor
  - Onkel Anna
 Shanti Roney - Kokken
  - Peter
  - Peters bror
 Christopher Læssø - Opvasker
 Nicolaj Kopernikus - Sebastians far

References

External links 

2007 comedy films
2007 films
Films directed by Thomas Vinterberg
Danish comedy films
2000s Danish-language films